Kelekçi is a village in the Dicle District of Diyarbakır Province in Turkey. In November 1992 and April 1993 the village was depopulated and destroyed by the Turkish authorities as the villagers did not want to be a part the Village Guards system.

See also 
 Kelekçi village destruction

References

Villages in Dicle District